Neotalus portai is a species of beetle in the family Carabidae, the only species in the genus Neotalus.

References

Pterostichinae